Andrew Michael Tracy (born December 11, 1973) is an American former Major League Baseball (MLB) first baseman who played for the Montreal Expos, Colorado Rockies, and Philadelphia Phillies between 2000 and 2009, and is currently the manager for the Columbus Clippers.

Amateur career
A native of Bowling Green, Ohio, Tracy attended Bowling Green High School and Bowling Green State University. In 1994, he played collegiate summer baseball with the Orleans Cardinals of the Cape Cod Baseball League.

Professional career

Montreal Expos
Drafted by the Montreal Expos in the 16th round of the 1996 Major League Baseball Draft, Tracy made his Major League Baseball debut with the Expos on April 25, .

Tracy compiled what would become a career high .260 batting average with 11 home runs and 32 RBI in 2000. Tracy split time backing up Expos starting first baseman Lee Stevens and starting third baseman Michael Barrett.

Tracy entered Spring Training of  competing for the starting third base position. The position was vacated when Barrett moved to the catcher position. Tracy competed with Geoff Blum, Fernando Tatís, Mike Mordecai, and Ryan Minor for the position, which ultimately went to Blum. After compiling a mere .109 batting average with 2 home runs and 8 RBI throughout the season, Tracy was selected off waivers from the Expos by the New York Mets on March 27, .

Colorado Rockies
Tracy would not appear at the MLB level again until the  season.

He spent the 2002 and  seasons in the minor league systems of the New York Mets and Colorado Rockies, respectively.

Tracy returned to the majors in 2004, appearing in 15 games for the Rockies, serving primarily as a pinch hitter. A .188 batting average with no home runs and one RBI was Tracy's offensive result by season's end.

Tracy began the  season playing for the Colorado Springs Sky Sox, the Triple-AAA affiliate of the Rockies.

Tohoku Rakuten Golden Eagles
Midway through the season he left the Rockies organization and finished the campaign playing for the Tohoku Rakuten Golden Eagles of the Japanese Pacific League.

The  and  seasons saw Tracy return to playing in the minor league systems of MLB's Baltimore Orioles and New York Mets, with no appearances in the majors.

Philadelphia Phillies
Tracy was invited to attend Spring Training with the Philadelphia Phillies as a non-roster invitee prior to the  season, but was assigned to minor league camp on March 9, 2008.  Tracy was assigned to the Phillies' Triple-AAA affiliate, the Lehigh Valley IronPigs, in Allentown, Pennsylvania until his call up to Philadelphia on August 23, . Before his call-up Tracy had not appeared at the MLB level since October 3, 2004. Tracy was designated for assignment on August 27 and was outrighted to the minors, but returned when the rosters expanded on September 1. He broke his hand, while playing for the Philadelphia Phillies, late in 2008 as a result of a line drive which ended his season.  The Phillies announced on September 9, 2009 that they would be releasing veteran pitcher Rodrigo López to make room on the roster for Tracy. The Phillies would win the World Series in 2008 and the National League pennant in 2009. Though Tracy was not an active member of the postseason roster in either season, he did accompany the club throughout the playoffs.

On August 5, 2010 it was announced that Tracy would be pulled from the IronPigs line up and benched to allow Matt Rizzotti to become the everyday first baseman after he was very successful for the Reading Phillies. According to Matt Eddy of baseballamerica.com, Tracy became a free agent after the 2010 season ended.

Tracy signed a minor league contract with the Arizona Diamondbacks on December 25, 2010 and was invited to 2011 Spring Training.

Coaching career
After the 2011 season, Tracy retired and was named manager of the Williamsport Crosscutters, the Phillies class A farm team.

References

Further reading

External links 

Andy Tracy at Pura Pelota (Venezuelan Professional Baseball League)

1973 births
Living people
Águilas Cibaeñas players
American expatriate baseball players in Canada
American expatriate baseball players in Japan
Bravos de Margarita players
American expatriate baseball players in Venezuela
Baseball coaches from Ohio
Baseball players from Ohio
Bowling Green Falcons baseball players
Cape Fear Crocs players
Colorado Rockies players
Colorado Springs Sky Sox players
Gigantes del Cibao players
Harrisburg Senators players
Jupiter Hammerheads players
Lehigh Valley IronPigs players
Major League Baseball first basemen
Major League Baseball third basemen
Minor league baseball managers
Montreal Expos players
New Orleans Zephyrs players
Norfolk Tides players
Orleans Firebirds players
Ottawa Lynx players
People from Bowling Green, Ohio
Philadelphia Phillies players
Reno Aces players
Tigres del Licey players
American expatriate baseball players in the Dominican Republic
Tohoku Rakuten Golden Eagles players
Tulsa Drillers players
Vermont Expos players
Yaquis de Obregón players
American expatriate baseball players in Mexico